China–France relations, also known as Franco-Chinese relations or Sino-French relations, are the interstate relations between China and France (Kingdom or later).

Note that the meaning of both "China" and "France" as entities has changed throughout history; this article will discuss what was commonly considered 'France' and 'China' at the time of the relationships in question.  There have been many political, cultural and economic relationships between the two countries since the Middle Ages. Rabban Bar Sauma from China visited France and met with King Philip IV of France. William of Rubruck encountered the French silversmith Guillaume Bouchier in the Mongol city of Karakorum.

Present-day relations are marked by both countries's respective regional powers stature (in the EU for France and Asia for China), as well as their shared status as G20 economies, permanent members of the UN Security Council, and internationally recognized nuclear-weapon states. Key differences include the question of democracy and human rights.

Today, France adheres to the One China policy, where France recognized the People's Republic of China as the sole legitimate government of "China", as opposed to the Republic of China, where it maintains unofficial relations.

The Chinese-French relationship was raised to the level of “global strategic partnership” in 2004. Strategic dialogue (last session from 23 to 24 January 2019), which began in 2001, deals with all areas of cooperation and aims to strengthen dialogue global issues, such as reform of global economic governance, climate change and regional crises.

Country comparison

History

17th and 18th centuries 

In 1698-1700 CE first French embassy to China took place via sea route. Numerous French Jesuits were active in China during the 17th and 18th centuries: Nicolas Trigault (1577–1629), Alexander de Rhodes (1591–1660, active in Vietnam), Jean-Baptiste Régis (1663–1738), Jean Denis Attiret (1702–1768), Michel Benoist (1715–1774), Joseph-Marie Amiot (1718–1793).

French Jesuits pressured the French king to send them to China with the aims of counterbalancing the influence of Ottoman Empire in Europe. The Jesuits sent by Louis XIV were: Jean de Fontaney (1643–1710), Joachim Bouvet
(1656-1730), Jean-François Gerbillon (1654–1707), Louis Le Comte (1655–1728) and Claude de Visdelou (1656–1737). Returning to France, they noticed the similarity between Louis XIV of France and the Kangxi Emperor of China. Both were said to be servants of God, and to control their respective areas: France being the strongest country of Europe, and China being the strongest power in East Asia. Other biographical factors lead commentators to proclaim that Louis XIV and the Kangxi Emperor were protected by the same angel. (In childhood, they overcame the same illness; both reigned for a long time, with many conquests.)

Under Louis XIV's reign, the work of these French researchers sent by the King had a notable influence on Chinese sciences, but continued to be mere intellectual games, and not tools to improve the power of man over nature. Conversely, Chinese culture and style became fashionable in France, exemplified by the Chinoiserie fashion, and Louis XIV had the Trianon de Porcelaine built in Chinese style in 1670. France became the European center for Chinese porcelains, silks and lacquers and European imitations of these goods.

At the same time, the first ever known Chinese people came to France. Michel Sin arrived in Versaille in 1684 before continuing on to England. More notable was Arcadio Huang, who crossed France in 1702, spent some time in Rome (as a result of the Chinese Rites controversy), and returned to Paris in 1704, where he was the "Chinese interpreter of the King" before he died in 1716. He started the first ever Chinese-French dictionary, and a Chinese grammar to help French and European researchers to understand and study Chinese, but died before finishing his work.

Paris-based geographers processed reports and cartographic material supplied by mostly French Jesuit teams traveling across the Qing Empire, and published a number of high-quality works, the most important of which was Description de la Chine et de la Tartarie Chinoise edited by Jean-Baptiste Du Halde (1736), with maps by Jean Baptiste Bourguignon d'Anville.

In the 18th century, the French Jesuit priest Michel Benoist, together with Giuseppe Castiglione, helped the Qianlong Emperor build a European-style area in the Old Summer Palace (often associated with European-style palaces built of stone), to satisfy his taste for exotic buildings and objects. Jean Denis Attiret became a painter to the Qianlong Emperor. Joseph-Marie Amiot (1718–1793) also won the confidence of the emperor and spent the remainder of his life in Beijing. He was official translator of Western languages for the emperor, and the spiritual leader of the French mission in Peking.

19th century 

French Catholic missionaries were active in China; they were funded by appeals in French churches for money.  The Holy Childhood Association (L'Oeuvre de la Sainte Enfance) was a Catholic charity founded in 1843 to rescue Chinese children from infanticide. It was a target of Chinese anti-Christian protests notably in the Tianjin Massacre of 1870. Rioting sparked by false rumors of the killing of babies led to the death of a French consul and provoked a diplomatic crisis.

Relations between Qing China and France deteriorated in the European rush for markets and as European opinion of China deteriorated, the once admired empire would become the subject of unequal treaties and colonisation. In 1844, China and France concluded its first modern treaty, the Treaty of Whampoa, which demanded for France the same privileges extended to Britain. In 1860, the Summer Palace was sacked by Anglo-French troops and many precious artifacts found their way into French museums following the sack.

Second Opium war

Sino-French war, 1884-1885

For centuries China had claimed the Indo-China territory to its south as a tributary state, but France began a series of invasions, turning French Indochina into its own colony. France and China clashed over control of Annam. The result was a conflict in 1884–85. The undeclared war was militarily a stalemate, but it recognize that France had control of Annam and Indochina was no longer a tributary of China. The main political result was that the war strengthened the control of Empress Dowager Cixi over the Chinese government, giving her the chance to block modernization programs needed by the Chinese military. The war was unpopular in France and it brought down the government of Prime Minister Jules Ferry. Historian Lloyd Eastman concluded in 1967:
The Chinese, although fettered by outmoded techniques and shortages of supplies, had fought the French to a stalemate. China lost, it is true, its claim to sovereignty over Vietnam, and that country remained under French dominance until 1954. But the French had been denied an indemnity; railroad construction had been averted; and imperial control of the southern boundaries of the rich natural resources lying within those boundaries had not been broken. In short, China was not much changed by the war.

In 1897, France seized Kwangchow Wan, (Guangzhouwan) as a treaty port, and took its own concession in the treaty port of Shanghai.  Kwangchow Wan was leased by China to France for 99 years (or until 1997, as the British did in Hong Kong's New Territories), according to the Treaty of 12 April 1898, on 27 May as Territoire de Kouang-Tchéou-Wan, to counter the growing commercial power of British Hong Kong and was effectively placed under the authority of the French Resident Superior in Tonkin (itself under the Governor General of French Indochina, also in Hanoi); the French Resident was represented locally by Administrators.

Railway construction

20th century

In 1900, France was a major participant in the Eight-Nation Alliance which invaded China to put down the Boxer Rebellion. In the early 20th century Chinese students began to come to France. Li Shizeng, Zhang Renjie, Wu Zhihui, and Cai Yuanpei formed an anarchist group which became the basis for the Diligent Work-Frugal Study Movement. Zhang started a gallery which imported Chinese art, and the dealer C.T. Loo developed his Paris gallery into an international center.

In 1905-1907 Japan made overtures on China to enlarge its sphere of influence to include Fujian. Japan was trying to obtain French loans and also avoid the Open Door Policy. Paris provided loans on condition that Japan respect the Open Door and not violate China's territorial integrity. In the French-Japanese Entente of 1907, Paris secured Japan's recognition of the special interests France possessed in “the regions of the Chinese Empire adjacent to the territories” where they had “the rights of sovereignty, protection or occupation,” which meant the French colonial possessions in southeast Asia as well as the French spheres of influence in three provinces in southern China—Yunnan, Guangxi, and Guangdong. In return, the French recognized Japan's spheres of influence in Korea, South Manchuria, and Inner Mongolia.

The French Third Republic recognized the establishment of the Republic of China and established diplomatic relations on 7October 1913. After the outbreak of war, the French government recruited Chinese workers to work in French factories. Li Shizeng and his friends organized the Société Franco-Chinoise d'Education (華法教育會 HuaFa jiaoyuhui) in 1916. Many worker-students who came to France after the war became high level members of the Chinese Communist Party (CCP). These included Zhou Enlai and Deng Xiaoping. The Institut Franco Chinoise de Lyon (1921—1951) promoted cultural exchanges.

During World War II, Free France and China fought as allied powers against the Axis powers of Germany, Italy and Japan. After the invasion of France in 1940, although the newly formed Vichy France was an ally of Germany, it continued to recognize the Kuomintang government of Chiang Kai-shek—which had to flee to Chongqing in the Chinese interior after the fall of Nanjing in 1937—rather than the Japanese-sponsored Reorganized National Government of China under Wang Jingwei. French diplomats in China remained accredited to the government in Chongqing.

On 18 August 1945 in Chongqing, while the Japanese were still occupying Kwangchow Wan following the surrender, a French diplomat from the Provisional Government and Kuo Chang Wu, Vice-Minister of Foreign Affairs of the Republic of China, signed the Convention between the Provisional Government of the French Republic and the National Government of China for the retrocession of the Leased Territory of Kouang-Tchéou-Wan. Almost immediately after the last Japanese occupation troops had left the territory in late September, representatives of the French and the Chinese governments went to Fort-Bayard to proceed to the transfer of authority; the French flag was lowered for the last time on 20 November 1945.

During the Cold War era, 1947–1991, France first established diplomatic relations with the People's Republic of China in 1964. France played a minor role in the Korean War. In the 1950s, communist insurgents based in China repeatedly invaded and attacked French facilities in Indochina. After a major defeat by the Vietnamese communists at Dien Bien Phu in 1954, France pulled out and turned North Vietnam over to the Communists. By exiting Southeast Asia, France avoided confrontations with China. However, the Cultural Revolution sparked violence against French diplomats in China, and relationships cooled. The powerful French Communist Party generally supported the Soviet Union in the Sino-Soviet split and China had therefore a very weak base of support inside France, apart from some militant students.

Cold War relations

After the Chinese Civil War (19271950) and the establishment of the new communist-led People's Republic of China (PRC) on 1 October 1949, the French Fourth Republic government did not recognize the PRC. Instead, France maintained relations with the Republic of China on Taiwan. However, by 1964 France and the PRC had re-established ambassadorial level diplomatic relations. This was precipitated by Charles de Gaulle's official recognition of the PRC. Before the Chinese Civil War, Deng Xiaoping had completed his studies in Paris prior to ascending to power in China.

Post-Cold War

This state of relations would not last, however. During the 1990s, France and the PRC repeatedly clashed as a result of the PRC's One China Policy. France sold weapons to Taiwan, angering the Beijing government. This resulted in the temporary closure of the French Consulate-General in Guangzhou. France eventually agreed to prohibit local companies from selling arms to Taiwan, and diplomatic relations resumed in 1994.  Since then, the two countries have exchanged a number of state visits. Today, Sino-French relations are primarily economic. Bilateral trade reached new high levels in 2000. Cultural ties between the two countries are less well represented, though France is making an effort to improve this disparity.  France has expanded its research facilities dealing with Chinese history, culture, and current affairs. Organizations associated with the International Liaison Department of the Chinese Communist Party maintain links with French parliamentarians.

In 2018 China made accusations against France after a French naval vessel transited the Taiwan Strait.

2008 rifts

In 2008, Sino-French relations took a downturn in the wake of the 2008 Summer Olympics torch relay. As torchbearers passed through Paris, activists fighting for Tibetan independence and human rights repeatedly attempted to disrupt, hinder or halt the procession. The Chinese government hinted that Sino-French friendship could be affected while Chinese protesters organized boycotts of the French-owned retail chain Carrefour in major Chinese cities including Kunming, Hefei and Wuhan. Hundreds of people also joined anti-French rallies in those cities and Beijing. Both governments attempted to calm relations after the demonstrations. French President Nicolas Sarkozy wrote a letter of support and sympathy to Jin Jing, a Chinese athlete who had carried the Olympic torch. Chinese leader Hu Jintao subsequently sent a special envoy to France to help strengthen relations.

However, relations again soured after President Sarkozy met the Dalai Lama in Poland in 2009. Chinese Premier Wen Jiabao omitted France in his tour of Europe in response, his assistant foreign minister saying of the rift "The one who tied the knot should be the one who unties it." French Prime Minister Jean-Pierre Raffarin was quoted in Le Monde as saying that France had no intention of "encourag[ing] Tibetan separatism".

Human rights

Hong Kong
In June 2020, France openly opposed the Hong Kong national security law.

Xinjiang
In March 2021, European Union leaders imposed sanctions on various Chinese Communist Party officials. China responded by sanctioning various French politicians such as Raphael Glucksmann

Taiwan
In 2021, French senator Alain Richard announced a visit to Taiwan. The Chinese embassy initially sent him letters requesting him to stop. After he refused to reconsider his trip, the Chinese embassy began Tweeting aggressive insults and threats against him and various other pro-Taiwan lawmakers and experts. The Chinese ambassador was summoned to underscore the unacceptable nature of the threats.

2019 trade deals
At a time when China–U.S. economic relations were deeply troubled, with a trade war underway, French President Emmanuel Macron and Chinese leader Xi Jinping signed a series of large-scale trade agreements in late March 2019 which covered many sectors over a period of years. The centerpiece was a €30 billion purchase of airplanes from Airbus. It came at a time when the leading American firm, Boeing, saw its entire fleet of new 737 MAX passenger planes grounded worldwide. Going well beyond aviation, the new trade agreement covered French exports of chicken, a French-built offshore wind farm in China, and a Franco-Chinese cooperation fund, as well as billions of Euros of co-financing between BNP Paribas and the Bank of China. Other plans included billions of euros to be spent on modernizing Chinese factories, as well as new ship building.

Public opinion
Survey published in 2020 by the Pew Research Center found that 70% of French had an unfavourable view of China.

Tourism 

In 2018, around 2.1 million Chinese tourists visited France. A 2014 poll indicated that Chinese tourists considered France to be the most welcoming nation in Europe.

Resident diplomatic missions 
 China has an embassy in Paris, consulates-general in Lyon, Marseille, Saint-Denis and Strasbourg, and a consulate in Papeete.
 France has an embassy in Beijing and consulates-general in Chengdu, Guangzhou, Hong Kong, Shanghai, Shenyang and Wuhan.

Education

French international schools in Mainland China include:
 Lycée Français International Charles de Gaulle de Pékin (Beijing)
 Lycée Français de Shanghai
 Wuhan French International School
 École Française Internationale de Canton (Guangzhou)

Shekou International School in Shenzhen has a section for primary school students using the French system.

There is also a French international school in Hong Kong: French International School of Hong Kong.

There is also a bilingual Chinese-French school aimed at Chinese children, École expérimentale franco-chinoise de Pékin (北京中法实验学校), which is converted from the former Wenquan No. 2 Middle School, in Haidian District, Beijing.

See also
 China–European Union relations
 History of Chinese foreign policy
 Foreign relations of China
 Foreign relations of imperial China
 China Policy Institute
 Historical Museum of French-Chinese Friendship

References

References

Further reading
 Becker, Bert. "France and the Gulf of Tonkin region: Shipping markets and political interventions in south China in the 1890s." Cross-Currents: East Asian History and Culture Review 4.2 (2015): 560–600. online
 Bonin, Hubert. French banks in Hong Kong (1860s-1950s): Challengers to British banks?" Groupement de Recherches Economiques et Sociales No. 2007-15.  2007.
 Bunkar, Bhagwan Sahai. "Sino-French Diplomatic Relations: 1964-81" China Report (Feb 1984) 20#1 pp 41–52
 Césari, Laurent, & Denis Varaschin.  Les Relations Franco-Chinoises au Vingtieme Siecle et Leurs Antecedents ["Sino-French relations in the 20th century and their antecedents"] (2003) 290 pp.
 Chesneaux, Jean, Marianne Bastid, and Marie-Claire Bergere. China from the Opium Wars to the 1911 Revolution (1976) Online.
 Cabestan, Jean-Pierre. "Relations between France and China: towards a Paris-Beijing axis?." China: an international journal 4.2 (2006): 327–340. online
 Christiansen, Thomas, Emil Kirchner, and Uwe Wissenbach. The European Union and China (Macmillan International Higher Education, 2019).
 Clyde, Paul Hibbert, and Burton F. Beers. The Far East: A History of Western Impacts and Eastern Responses, 1830-1975 (1975). online
 Cotterell, Arthur. Western Power in Asia: Its Slow Rise and Swift Fall, 1415 - 1999 (2009) popular history;  excerpt
 Eastman, Lloyd E. Throne and Mandarins: China's Search for a Policy during the Sino-French controversy, 1880-1885 (Harvard University Press, 1967) 
 Gundry, Richard S. ed. China and Her Neighbours: France in Indo-China, Russia and China, India and Thibet (1893), magazine articles online.
 Hughes, Alex.  France/China: intercultural imaginings (2007)  online
 Mancall, Mark. China at the center: 300 years of foreign policy (1984). passim.
 Martin, Garret. "Playing the China Card? Revisiting France's Recognition of Communist China, 1963–1964." Journal of Cold War Studies 10.1 (2008): 52–80.
 Morse, Hosea Ballou. International Relations of the Chinese Empire: The Period of Conflict: 1834-1860. (1910) online 
 Morse, Hosea Ballou. International Relations of the Chinese Empire: The Period of Submission: 1861–1893. (1918) online
 Morse, Hosea Ballou. International Relations of the Chinese Empire: The Period of Subjection: 1894-1911  (1918) online
 Morse, Hosea Ballou. The Trade and Administration of the Chinese Empire (1908) online
 Pieragastini, Steven. "State and Smuggling in Modern China: The Case of Guangzhouwan/Zhanjiang." Cross-Currents: East Asian History and Culture Review 7.1 (2018): 118–152. online
 Skocpol, Theda. "France, Russia, China: A structural analysis of social revolutions." Comparative Studies in Society and History 18.2 (1976): 175–210.
 Upton, Emory. The Armies of Asia and Europe: Embracing Official Reports on the Armies of Japan, China, India, Persia, Italy, Russia, Austria, Germany, France, and England (1878).  Online
 Wellons, Patricia. "Sino‐French relations: Historical alliance vs. economic reality." Pacific Review 7.3 (1994): 341–348.
 Weske, Simone. "The role of France and Germany in EU-China relations." CAP Working Paper (2007) online.
  Young, Ernest. Ecclesiastical Colony: China's Catholic Church and the French Religious Protectorate,  (Oxford UP, 2013)
 List of sources from Sciences-Po

 
France
Bilateral relations of France